The Hustler is a 1959 novel by American writer Walter Tevis. It tells the story of a young pool hustler, Edward "Fast Eddie" Felson, who challenges the legendary Minnesota Fats.

The Hustler was adapted into a 1961 film of the same title, starring Paul Newman as Fast Eddie and Jackie Gleason as Minnesota Fats. The film was a critical and commercial success and was nominated for multiple Academy Awards. It remains widely regarded as a classic.

Synopsis
Bert teaches him about winning, or more particularly about losing. Tautly written, it is a treatise on how someone, with all of the skills, can lose if he "wants" to lose; how a loser is beaten by himself, not by his opponent; and how he can learn to win, if he can look deeply enough into himself.

The book was followed by the sequel The Color of Money.

Printing history
Available editions include:

1976:  
1979:  
2006:

See also

References

1959 American novels
Novels by Walter Tevis
American novels adapted into films
American sports novels
Cue sports literature
Harper & Brothers books
1959 debut novels

de:Haie der Großstadt
fr:L'Arnaqueur
nl:The Hustler
ja:ハスラー